Pterocyrtus cavicola is a species of beetle in the family Carabidae, which was first described in 1994 by Barry Philip Moore.

It is found only in Tasmania.

References

Carabidae
Taxa described in 1994